Korba is one of 11 Lok Sabha parliamentary constituency in Chhattisgarh state in India. It was formed as per the recommendation of the Delimitation Commission.

Assembly segments
Korba Lok Sabha constituency is composed of the following assembly segments:

Members of Parliament

Election results

2019 results

See also
 Korba
 List of Constituencies of the Lok Sabha

References

Lok Sabha constituencies in Chhattisgarh
Korba district
Koriya district
Bilaspur district, Chhattisgarh
Korba, Chhattisgarh

2. http://www.elections.in/chhattisgarh/parliamentary-constituencies/korba.html